Stephen Patrick Mackey (10 November 1966 – 2 March 2023) was an English musician and record producer best known as the bass guitarist for the alternative rock band Pulp, which he joined in 1989. As a record producer, he produced songs and albums by M.I.A., Florence + the Machine, The Long Blondes and Arcade Fire.

Early life
Mackey was born in Sheffield on 10 November 1966. In his early years he attended Hucklow First and Middle Schools with friend Richard Hawley. They would later play together as members of Pulp. He attended Hinde House Comprehensive in Sheffield before undertaking further studies at Richmond College of Further Education. Before joining Pulp, he played bass for another Sheffield band called Trolley Dog Shag, who were featured alongside Pulp on a Dolebusters compilation album in 1987. He moved to London in 1988 to pursue an interest in film-making and graduated from London's Royal College of Art, in 1992, MA Film.

Pulp
Joining Pulp in 1989, he played on Separations, released on Fire Records. He continued to write, record and tour with the band as they found success in the 1990s. Subsequent albums recorded included Intro – The Gift Recordings, His 'n' Hers, Different Class, This Is Hardcore and We Love Life. After an 8-year hiatus Mackey returned to activity with Pulp in 2010 and their subsequent world tours in 2011 and 2012 and the release of their single "After You", working with producer James Murphy of LCD Soundsystem. Before his death, Mackey had announced he would not be part of Pulp's 2023 reunion tour.

Further music career
Forming a songwriting/production partnership with Ross Orton (known as Cavemen), he met Maya Arulpragasam (M.I.A.) and co-wrote and produced "Galang" and "Sunshowers", which led to M.I.A. securing a deal with Interscope Records and releasing "Arular". They worked together again on "Bird Flu" from her subsequent album Kala. Mackey and Orton continued to produce and remix for artists including Kelis, Cornershop, The Kills and The Horrors.
Mackey also produced and co-wrote songs for Florence and the Machine's debut album Lungs, including "Kiss with a Fist", "Girl with One Eye" and "Swimming" and also The Long Blondes' debut album Someone to Drive You Home. During this period he continued to record and tour with Jarvis Cocker, in 2006 for his debut solo album for Rough Trade Records (Jarvis) and again in 2008 recording the album Further Complications at Electrical Studios, Chicago with Steve Albini.

In 2011 Mackey produced Summer Camp's Welcome to Condale album and in 2012 he again worked as producer for Palma Violets' debut album on Rough Trade Records, 180, released in February 2013. Also in 2012 he produced "Railroad Track" by Willy Moon released on Jack White's Third Man Records.

In 2014 he recorded and mixed for Dean Blunt's Black Metal album and in 2015 began working with Yak, recording their single "No" released on Third Man Records. He mixed Danny Goffey of Supergrass' Take Your Jacket Off and Get into It LP. Yak's Alas Salvation LP was recorded with him during the rest of 2015 and released in early 2016.

In 2017 he was awarded an Ivor Novello Award along with the other members of Pulp for Outstanding Song Collection presented by Peter Saville, graphic designer of record sleeves for Joy Division, New Order and Pulp.

Mackey has also worked with John Gosling (formerly of Psychic TV) as a music director and sound designer creating mixes and original compositions for films, museums and other commercial projects, including the Museum of Modern Art in New York City, the Louvre in Paris, and the Minsheng Art Museum in Shanghai.

Other projects
In 2005, Mackey played a cameo role as one of The Weird Sisters, a wizarding rock band in the film Harry Potter and the Goblet of Fire. The fictitious group also featured Jonny Greenwood and Phil Selway of Radiohead and Pulp frontman Jarvis Cocker.

In 2006, Mackey and Cocker curated an acclaimed 2 CD compilation called The Trip featuring music from various eras including Moondog, Carl Orff, The Birthday Party, The Fall and the theme to Radio 4's Shipping Forecast.

From 2003 to 2008, Mackey co-curated the music program of London's annual Frieze International Art Fair, which included performances from Karlheinz Stockhausen, Sunn O))), Glenn Branca, and Rodney Graham.

In 2012, he played with drummer Seb Rochford as the rhythm section for tracks on Serafina Steers The Moths Are Real LP.

In 2016, he began the Call This Number guerrilla TV project with Jeannette Lee, formerly of Public Image Ltd. and Douglas Hart, former bassist of the Jesus and Mary Chain, making erratic film broadcasts from a North London garage. Artists he recorded for this included Jon Spencer Blues Explosion, Dennis Bovell, Sleaford Mods, Primal Scream, and Gruff Rhys.

Personal life and death
In 2009, Mackey married his longtime girlfriend, stylist and fashion journalist, Katie Grand. He lived in North London with his wife, and son, Marley (born 1996).

Mackey died on the morning of 2 March 2023. He was 56, and had been in hospital for the past three months with an undisclosed illness.

Discography

With Pulp

Studio albums

 Separations (1991)
 His 'n' Hers (1994) (#9 UK, Gold)
 Different Class (1995) (#1 UK, 4× Platinum)
 This Is Hardcore (1998) (#1 UK, No. 114 US, Gold)
 We Love Life (2001) (#6 UK, Silver)

Compilations
Intro – The Gift Recordings – non-album singles compilation (1993)
Countdown 1992–1983 – compilation of tracks from the Fire/Red Rhino era (1996) No. 10 UK
Pulp Goes to the Disco (1998)
Freshly Squeezed... the Early Years – North-American release (1998)
Primal: The Best of the Fire Years 1983–1992 (1998)
Pulped 1983–1992 – four-CD box set, featuring the first three albums, plus Masters of the Universe (2000)
Hits – official greatest hits compilation (2002) No. 71 UK
The Peel Sessions (2006) – compilation of all the Peel sessions from Pulp

UK singles

Singles

Steve Mackey has also made appearances on the following albums as a musician:

 Various Artists – See You Later Agitator (compilation, 1987)
 Trolley Dog Shag, : "(This is) The Business Boys", 1987
 Marianne Faithfull – Kissin' Time (2002)
Track: "Sliding through Life on Charm"
 Various Artists – The Last Great Wilderness Soundtrack (2003)
With band The Nu Forest, track: "I Picked a Flower" (also released as a single)
 Various Artists – Harry Potter and the Goblet of Fire Soundtrack (2005)
With band The Weird Sisters, tracks: "Do the Hippogriff", "This is the Night", "Magic Works"
 Various Artists – Pirate Ballads, Sea Songs and Chanteys (compilation, 2006)
With artist Jarvis Cocker, track: "A Drop of Nelson's Blood"
 Jarvis Cocker – Jarvis (2006)
 Jarvis Cocker – Further Complications (2009)
 Serafina Steer – The Moths are Real (2013)

As a songwriter/producer
Steve Mackey has appeared on the following albums as a Producer:

 Marianne Faithfull – Kissin' Time (2002)
Track: – "Sliding Through Life on Charm" (with Jarvis Cocker)
 M.I.A. – Arular (2005)
Tracks: "Sunshowers" and "Galang" (both with Ross Orton and Maya Arulpragasam)
 M.I.A. – Kala (2007)
Tracks: "Bird Flu" (with Ross Orton )
 Bromheads Jacket- Dits from the Commuter Belt (2006)
With Ross Orton
 Ultra Brain – Neo Punk (2006)
With Ross Orton
 The Long Blondes – Someone to Drive You Home (2006)
 Florence and the Machine – "Kiss With a Fist"
 Summer Camp – "Welcome to Condale" (2011)
Palma Violets – "180" (2013)
Willy Moon  – "Railroad Track/ Here's Willy Moon" (2013)
Arcade Fire - "Everything Now" (2017)

As a remixer
Steve Mackey is also known for his remixes, and he has remixed the following tracks (among others):

 Looper – Up a Tree Again (The Chocolate Layers' St John's Ambulance mix)
Appears on: Looper – Who's Afraid of Y2K? / Up a Tree Again single (1999)
 Black Box Recorder – The Facts of Life (The Chocolate Layers' Remix)
Appears on: Black Box Recorder – The Art Of Driving single (2000) and The Worst of Black Box Recorder (compilation, 2001)
 Death in Vegas – Dirge (Cossack apocalypse mix by the Chocolate Layers)
Appears on: Death in Vegas – Dirge promo single (2000)
 The White Sport – Complete Control (King Precare Mix by Two Desperate People) (Jarvis Cocker)
Appears on: The White Sport – Complete Control single (2002)
 Cornershop – Topknot (Cavemen Remix)
Appears on: Cornershop – Topknot single (2004)
 M.I.A. – Galang (Cavemen Remix)
Appears on: M.I.A. – Galang single (2004)
 M.I.A. – Bird Flu (Cavemen Remix)
Appears on: M.I.A. – Kala album (bonus track) (2007)
 Budnubac – Indestructible (Cavemen's 'Insecure' Mix)
Appears on: Budnubac – Indestructible single (2004)
 Dark Globe – Break My World (Break My Bones Mix – Steve Mackey and The Fat Truckers)
Appears on: Dark Globe – Break My World single (2004)
 The Kills – Love is a Deserter (Cavemen Remix)
Appears on: The Kills – Love Is A Deserter single (2005)
 Death from Above 1979 – Romantic Rights (Cavemen's Death From The Inside Remix)
Appears on: Death from Above 1979 – You're a Woman, I'm A Machine album (2005)
 The Perceptionists – Party Hard (Cavemen Remix)
Appears on: The Perceptionists – Party Hard promo single (2005)
 Archie Bronson Outfit – Dead Funny (Cavemen Remix)
Appears on: Archie Bronson Outfit – Dead Funny single (2006)
 Kelis – Bossy (Cavemen Remix)
Appears on: Kelis – Bossy single (2006)
 The Horrors – "She is The New Thing"

Notes:
 The Chocolate Layers remixes are by Steve Mackey and Jarvis Cocker
 The Cavemen remixes are by Steve Mackey and Ross Orton

References

External Links
 
 

1966 births
2023 deaths
Alumni of the Royal College of Art
English rock bass guitarists
Male bass guitarists
Musicians from Sheffield
Pulp (band) members
English record producers
English songwriters
Britpop musicians